The Hotel Schools of Distinction (HSD) (formerly Leading Hotel Schools of the World - LHSW) is an association of educational institutions with hoteliers, specifically those hoteliers affiliated with The Leading Hotels of the World, to provide hospitality programs worldwide.

Member institutions
 The Institut de tourisme et d’hôtellerie du Québec
 Haaga-Helia University Of Applied Sciences
 Hotelschool The Hague
 Institute of Hotel Management, Aurangabad (IHM-A)
 International University of Applied Sciences Bad Honnef - Bonn
 Niagara University
 Universidad San Ignacio de Loyola
 Norwegian School of Hotel Management
 Escuela Universitaria de Hotelería y Turismo de Sant Pol, Barcelona

External links
Official website of the Hotel Schools of Distinction (HSD)

International college and university associations and consortia